Nerita senegalensis is a species of sea snail, a marine gastropod mollusk in the family Neritidae.

Description
The length of the shell attains 13 mm.

Nerita senegalensis is a marine gastropod that appears to have a preference for specific levels of the shore. According to some laboratory and field experiments, displaced snails exhibit a general 'homing' behavior when displaced down-shore or up shore. However, cues involved in this migrational behavior have yet to be identified.

Distribution
This marine species occurs off Gabon and Senegal.

References

 Gofas, S., Afonso, J.P. & Brandào, M. (1985). Conchas e Moluscos de Angola = Coquillages et Mollusques d'Angola. [Shells and molluscs of Angola]. Universidade Agostinho / Elf Aquitaine Angola: Angola. 140 pp. Printed without date.
 Rolán E., 2005. Malacological Fauna From The Cape Verde Archipelago. Part 1, Polyplacophora and Gastropoda
 Bernard P.A. (1984). Coquillages du Gabon [Shells of Gabon]. Pierre A. Bernard: Libreville, Gabon. 140 pp, 75 plates, illus

External links
 Gmelin J.F. (1791). Vermes. In: Gmelin J.F. (Ed.) Caroli a Linnaei Systema Naturae per Regna Tria Naturae, Ed. 13. Tome 1(6). G.E. Beer, Lipsiae
 Reeve, L. A. (1855). Monograph of the genus Nerita. In: Conchologia Iconica, or, illustrations of the shells of molluscous animals, vol. 9, pls 1-19, and unpaginated text. L. Reeve & Co., London
 Philippi, R. A. (1849). Centuria tertia testaceorum novorum. Zeitschrift für Malakozoologie. 5(10

Neritidae
Gastropods described in 1791